Luli Deste ( Bodenhausen; 7 November 1902 – 7 July 1951) was a German-American stage and film actress.

Deste studied dancing with Mary Wigman in Berlin but changed to acting. She was an understudy to Elisabeth Bergner, acted in repertory theater, and progressed to leading roles in Vienna, after which she acted in London.

In London, Deste acted in films directed by Marion Gering. After he put her under personal contract, he brought her to the United States and directed her films for Columbia Pictures. Her Hollywood film debut came in 1937, and she later acted for Universal Pictures.

Deste was married to Baron Gotfried Hohenberg, and they were divorced in 1930.

Filmography

References

Bibliography
 Robert McLaughlin. We'll Always Have the Movies: American Cinema during World War II. University Press of Kentucky, 2006.

External links
 

1902 births
1951 deaths
German film actresses
German stage actresses
German emigrants to the United States